Hermann Weiland (born 16 November 1949) is a German born Olympic equestrian of Croatia. He competed for Croatia at the 1992 Summer Olympics in the individual jumping event with horse Dufy 2. He finished 72nd with 52 jumping penalties.

References 

Equestrians at the 1992 Summer Olympics
Croatian male equestrians
1949 births
Olympic equestrians of Croatia
Living people